Ederson Vilela Pereira (born 6 June 1990) is a Brazilian distance runner who competes in events from 1500 metres to the marathon. He was the gold medallist in the 10,000 metres at the 2019 Pan American Games. He has also won medals in the 5000 metres at the 2017 South American Championships in Athletics and the 3000 metres at the 2016 Ibero-American Championships in Athletics.

Pereira has represented his nation in cross country running four times at the World Athletics Cross Country Championships (2008, 2009, 2011, 2013) and shared in team titles with the Brazilian men at the South American Cross Country Championships in 2007, 2008, 2009, 2011, and 2013.  He competed at the 2020 World Athletics Half Marathon Championships.

He holds personal bests of 13:23.24 minutes for the 5000 metres, 28:27.47 for the 10,000 metres and 2:13:15 hours for the marathon. He is a three-time national champion at the Troféu Brasil de Atletismo, winning in the 5000 m in 2013 and in the 10,000 metres in 2018 and 2019.

International competitions

National titles
Brazilian Athletics Championships
5000 m: 2013
10,000 m: 2018, 2019

References

External links

1990 births
Living people
Brazilian male middle-distance runners
Brazilian male long-distance runners
Brazilian male marathon runners
Brazilian male cross country runners
Pan American Games gold medalists for Brazil
Pan American Games gold medalists in athletics (track and field)
Athletes (track and field) at the 2019 Pan American Games
Troféu Brasil de Atletismo winners
Medalists at the 2019 Pan American Games
20th-century Brazilian people
21st-century Brazilian people